Punctulum wyvillethomsoni is a species of minute sea snail, a marine gastropod mollusk or micromollusk in the family Rissoidae.

Distribution
This species occurs in European waters and in the Northwest Atlantic Ocean.

Description 
The maximum recorded shell length is 3.8 mm.

Habitat 
Minimum recorded depth is 95 m. Maximum recorded depth is 300 m.

References

 Abbott, R.T. (1974). American Seashells. 2nd ed. Van Nostrand Reinhold: New York, NY (USA). 663 pp.
 Mayhew, R. and F. Cole. 1994 MS. A taxonomic discussion and update of shell-bearing marine molluscs recorded from NW Atlantic North of Cape Cod (excluding Greenland), and Canadian Arctic Archipeligo. 
 Gofas, S.; Le Renard, J.; Bouchet, P. (2001). Mollusca, in: Costello, M.J. et al. (Ed.) (2001). European register of marine species: a check-list of the marine species in Europe and a bibliography of guides to their identification. Collection Patrimoines Naturels, 50: pp. 180–213

Rissoidae
Gastropods described in 1877